Utica Township may refer to the following townships in the United States:

 Utica Township, LaSalle County, Illinois
 Utica Township, Clark County, Indiana
 Utica Township, Chickasaw County, Iowa
 Utica Township, Winona County, Minnesota